Beatrice Scalvedi (born 23 June 1995 in Bellinzona) is a swiss former alpine skier who won the silver medal in downhill at the World Junior Alpine Skiing Championships 2016 and started one World Cup race in the same year.

Having her career limited because of various injuries, she was forced to retire in 2018 due to back problems after more than one year of inactivity. After retiring from professional sports, she began studying psychology.

References

External links
 

1995 births
Living people
Swiss female alpine skiers
People from Bellinzona
Sportspeople from Ticino
21st-century Swiss women